Laylā bint Ṭarīf (Arabic: لَيلْى بنت طريف, d. 815 CE) was a female warrior and poet and one of the Khawarij, a group known for its members' fanaticism and violent opposition to the established Caliphate, believing that leadership of the Muslim community was not limited to male Arabs of the Quraysh tribe. On the basis of women fighting alongside Muhammad, the Khawarij have viewed combat as a requirement for women, and Laylā bint Ṭarīf is a prominent example of this custom. Laylā was the sister of the Kharijite leader al-Walid ibn Tarif al-Shaybani (d. 795). After al-Walīd's death, Laylā took on the leadership of his army and fought two battles before her clan forced her to step down.

Sample
As translated by Abdullah al-Udhari, Laylā's elegy for her fallen brother runs:

Her work shows some influence from the earlier woman poet al-Khansa.

References

815 deaths
Arab women
Women poets of the medieval Islamic world
Arabic-language women poets
8th-century women writers
9th-century women writers
8th-century Arabic poets 
9th-century Arabic poets 
Women warriors
Kharijites
Women in medieval warfare
Women in war in the Middle East
Arab women in war